Ribonuclease P protein subunit p40 is an enzyme that in humans is encoded by the RPP40 gene.

References

Further reading

EC 3.1.26